Sir Roger O'Shaughnessy, The O'Shaughnessy (died 11 July 1690), was Chief of the Name and a captain in the Irish army of James II of England. He was present at the Battle of the Boyne, and died ("sick, though not wounded") ten days after the battle at his castle in Gort. All his property was declared forfeit, and his son and heir, William O'Shaughnessy, was forced into exile. 

In 1697 Roger's estates were granted to Sir Thomas Prendergast, 1st Baronet,  a Catholic neighbor; who had previously been a Jacobite and Confederate and had lost most of his own estates during the Cromwellian Wars; but this time decided to switch sides. There followed decades of legal disputes with the Prendergasts, but  the O'Shaughnessy family were never able to recover them.

Family
Roger was the son of Dermot O'Shaughnessy.

He married Helena, daughter of Conor O'Brien, a son of Donogh O'Brien, 4th Earl of Thomond. Her brother was William O'Brien.

Their children were:
 Helena. She married Theobald Butler. They had three children: Francis, John and Theobald.
 Major General William O'Shaughnessy, The O'Shaughnessy.

Roger O'Shaughnessy succeeded to the O'Shaugnessy lands in Ireland in 1678.

References

Further reading
 D'Alton, John, Illustrations, Historical and Genealogical, of King James's Irish Army List (1689). Dublin: 1st edition (single volume), 1855. pp. 328–32.
 O'Hart, John, Irish Pedigrees. Dublin: James Duffy and Co. 5th edition, 1892. pp. 754–6
 History of Galway, James Hardiman, 1820
 Tabular pedigrees of O'Shaughnessy of Gort (1543–1783), Martin J. Blake, Journal of the Galway Archaeological and Historical Society, vi (1909–10), p. 64; vii (1911–12), p. 53.
 Old Galway, Professor Mary Donovan O'Sullivan, 1942
 Galway: Town and Gown, edited Moran et al., 1984
 Galway: History and Society, 1996

People from County Galway
Roger
1690 deaths
17th-century Irish people
O'Shaughnessy
Year of birth unknown